The Individual Speedway Junior Polish Championship is an annual speedway event held each year organized by the Polish Motor Union (PZM) since 1967. Polish riders aged 21 and under take part.

Previous winners

References

 
Poland
Individual